Nayan Bahadur Khatri (died 24 May 2019) was a Nepalese judge who served as 6th Chief Justice of Nepal, in office from 8 December 1976 to 10 December 1985. He was appointed by the then-king of Nepal, Birendra. He was the longest serving Chief Justice of Nepal.

Khatri was preceded by Ratna Bahadur Bista and succeeded by Dhanendra Bahadur Singh. He also served as an ambassador to China from 1986 to 1990.

He died on May 24, 2019, at the age of 99.

References 

2019 deaths
Year of birth uncertain
Ambassadors of Nepal to China
Chief justices of Nepal